Sheen Kaaf Nizam, born in the year 1945 or 1946 in Jodhpur, India, is an Urdu poet and literary scholar. His birth name is Shiv Kishan Bissa. Sheen Kaaf Nizam is his pen name. He has edited many volumes of poets in Devanagari including Deewan-e-Ghalib and Deewan-e-Mir.

Literary career

Nizam has published a number of poetry collections. Listed down are his books.

 Lamhon kee Saleeb
 Dasht mein Dariya
 Naad
 Saya Koi Lamba Na Tha
 Bayazein Kho Gayi Hai
 Gumshuda Dair ki Gunjti Ghantiyan
 Rasta Yeh Kahin Nahin Jaata
”orr Bhi hai naam raaste ka “
”saayon Ke saaye me”

 
Nizam's poetry collection Gumshuda Dair ki Gunjti Ghantiyan won the 2010 Sahitya Akademi Award in Urdu.

Nizam compiled an appraisal of the life and works of fellow Rajasthani Urdu poet Makhmoor Saeedi titled Bheed mein akelaa was published by the Rajasthan Urdu Akademi in 2007.

He has edited a book on renowned research scholar “allama kalidas Gupta riza” titled “Ghalibiyat or gupta riza”
He has also edited and introduced Morden Urdu poet “meera Ji “ with selection of his poems in Nagri.
A selection of Famous Pakistani Urdu poet “munir niyazi” has also been published in Nagri by him.

Criticism

”lafz dar lafz”
”mani dar mani”
”tazkira massir shoara e Jodhpur”

See also
 List of Sahitya Akademi Award winners for Urdu

References

1947 births
Living people
Recipients of the Sahitya Akademi Award in Urdu
Recipients of the Gangadhar National Award
Indian male poets
Poets from Rajasthan
Urdu-language poets from India